Štefanovce is a village and municipality in Vranov nad Topľou District in the Prešov Region of eastern Slovakia.

History
In historical records, the village was first mentioned in 1473.

Geography
The municipality lies at an altitude of 215 metres and covers an area of 8.925 km2. It has a population of about 107 people.

External links
 
http://www.statistics.sk/mosmis/eng/run.html

Villages and municipalities in Vranov nad Topľou District